A number of mid-air collisions and incidents have taken place in the United Kingdom.

1910s
1914
 12 May 1914 two Royal Flying Corps Sopwith Three-seaters collided at Aldershot, two killed.
1915
 12 September 1915 A Royal Naval Air Service Short S.38 was destroyed in a mid-air collision with a Caudron G.III at Eastchurch, both pilots killed.
1916
 10 May 1916 – two civil aircraft collide at Hendon, one killed.
 10 August 1916 – an Armstrong Whitworth FK.3 crashes after a collision near Lilbourne, two killed.
 8 September 1916 – Bristol Scout Type D of the RNAS collides with another Bristol Scout near Cranwell, one killed.
 26 September 1916 – Bristol Scout Type C of the RNAS collides with another aircraft near Cranwell, one killed.
 5 October 1916 – Two B.E.2cs collide at Upavon, two killed including Keith Lucas.
1917
 12 February 1917 – A RFC B.E.2c collides with a Martinsyde at Upavon, two killed.
 15 March 1917 – A RFC B.E.2c collides with a Bristol Scout in the Barnet area, two killed.
 23 March 1917 – Two Sopwith 1½ Strutters of the Central Flying School collide at Upavon, two killed.
 23 April 1917 – A RFC Maurice Farman Shorthorn collides with another aircraft in the Edinburgh area, two killed.
 22 May 1917 – Two B.E.12s collide while breaking formation near Hove, two killed.
 16 June 1917 – A B.E.2e collides with another aircraft at Scampton, Lincolnshire, one killed.
 17 July 1917 – A RNAS Sopwith Baby crashed into sea after a collision with a Curtiss H.12 near Felixstowe, one killed.
 10 August 1917 – An Avro 504A collided with a B.E.12 at Catterick, two killed.
 17 August 1917 – An Avro 504J crashed into the River Thames after colliding with another Avro 504J near Purfleet, one killed.
 20 August 1917 – Two B.E.2e collide near Godmanchester, two killed.
 20 August 1917 – An R.E.8 collides with another R.E.8 while formation flying near Yatesbury Aerodrome, two killed.
 30 August 1917 – A B.E.2e collides with a B.E.12 at Catterick, two killed.
 23 October 1917 – An Avro 504J collides with a Nieuport 20 at Colehurst, two killed.
 26 October 1917 – A Sopwith Triplane collides with another aircraft near Manston, Kent, one killed.
 3 November 1917 – Two Avro 504Js collide near Scampton, two killed.
 4 November 1917 – Two Avro 504Js collide in Ayrshire, Scotland, one killed.
 4 November 1917 – An Avro 504J collides with another aircraft at Gosport, one killed.
 12 November 1917 – Two Sopwith Camels collide at Wallington, Surrey, two killed.
 14 November 1917 – A Sopwith Camel and B.E.2e collide at Edinburgh, Scotland, two killed.
 12 December 1917 – A B.E.2e crashed after a collision with another aircraft near Appleshaw, Andover, one killed.
 20 December 1917 – A RNAS Sea Scout Zero airship collided with another airship at Jevington, Sussex, one killed.
 23 December 1917 – Two De Havilland DH.6s collide on take-off at Stamford, two killed.
 24 December 1917 – Two B.E.2es collide at Lake Down, two killed.

1930s
1931
 On 6 May 1931 Bristol Bulldog K1081 of 17 Squadron RAF collided with another Bulldog, pilot killed.
 On 26 October 1931 two RAF Armstrong Whitworth Atlas of 13 Squadron RAF collide in Wiltshire, two killed in K1017 and one in J9526, a passenger survived.
1939
 On 1 Aug 1939 two RAF Airspeed Oxfords of No. 15 Flying Training School collide near RAF Lossiemouth, Scotland and both crash into the sea.

1940s
1940
 On 10 June 1940 a RAF North American Harvard and an Airspeed Oxford collide, Oxford crashes.
 On 9 July 1940 two RAF Airspeed Oxfords collide and crash near Fawler, Oxfordshire.
 On 17 July 1940 a RAF Airspeed Oxford collides with a Miles Master.
 On 23 September 1940 two RAF Airspeed Oxfords collide near RAF Shawbury, both crash.
 On 29 December 1940 two out of a section patrol of three Westland Whirlwinds of 263 Squadron collide over Dartmoor.
1941
 On 28 April 1941 two RAF Airspeed Oxfords collide on approach to RAF South Cerney.
 On 17 June 1941 a RAF Fairey Battle and an Airspeed Oxford collide on approach to RAF Shawbury.
 On 18 July 1941 two RAF Airspeed Oxfords collide on approach to RAF Shawbury.
 On 14 September 1941 two RAF Airspeed Oxfords collide during formation flying near RAF South Cerney, one crashed in flames.
 On 9 October 1941 two out of a formation of six Westland Whirlwinds of 263 Squadron collide over Saltford, Somerset.
 On 27 October 1941 a RAF Airspeed Oxford and a Percival Proctor collide, Oxford crashed near RAF Upper Heyford.
1942
 On 17 May 1942 two RAF Airspeed Oxfords collide on approach to Bridleway Gate.
 On 19 May 1942 two RAF Airspeed Oxfords collide while formation flying, one aircraft crashes near RAF Driffield.
1943
 On 23 October 1943 two RAF Supermarine Spitfire Vbs of 66 Squadron collide near Perranporth.
 On 27 October 1943 two RAF Supermarine Spitfire Vbs of 340 Squadron collide in East Lothian, Scotland.
 On 19 October 1943 two RAF Hawker Hurricane IVs of 186 Squadron collide near Alloa, Clackmannan.
 On 7 November 1943 a RAF Miles Master of 5 PAFU collides with an Avro Anson of the same unit near Longford, Shropshire.
 On 7 November 1943 two RAF Vickers Wellingtons (one from 26 OTU and the other from 27 OTU) collide near Abbots Ripton, Huntingdonshire.
1944
 On 19 May 1944 two RAF North American Mustang IIIs of 122 Squadron collide in cloud new Honeywood House in Surrey.
 On 18 August 1944 a RAF North American Mustang III of 306 Squadron and a RAF Supermarine Spitfire collide near Han Street, Kent.
1945
 On 23 March 1945 two RAF North American Mustang IIIs 126 Squadron collide and near West Raynham.
 On 11 April 1945 two RAF North American Mustang IIIs of 316 Squadron collide near Andrews Field.
 On 16 May 1945 two RAF North American Mustang IIIs of 309 Squadron collide 45 miles east of Bradwell Bay.
 On 23 May 1945 two RAF North American Mustang IIIs of 64 Squadron collide during a practice dogfight near Cantley in Norfolk.
 On 13 July 1945 two RAF North American Mustang IIIs of 315 Squadron collide near Wickham Bishops, Essex.
 On 2 October 1945 two Royal Air Force (RAF) Supermarine Spitfires of 695 Squadron collide over Norfolk while in formation.
 On 11 October 1945 a RN Fairey Swordfish of the Air Torpedo Development Unit collided with a RAF Bristol Beaufighter over the Solent and crashed into the sea.
 On 28 November 1945 two RAF de Havilland Tiger Moths of No. 24 Elementary Flying Training School collide at RAF Sealand causing one to fatally crash.
 On 13 December 1945 two RAF Supermarine Spitfires of No. 80 Operational Training Unit collided over County Durham while in formation.
1946
 On 15 January 1946 two Royal Air Force (RAF) Gloster Meteor IIIs of 124 Squadron collided at Bentwaters, Suffolk.
 On 18 January 1946 two RAF North American Harvard IIs collided at RAF Cranwell.
 On 23 January 1946 a RAF Miles Martinet of RAF Spilsby collides with another Martinet and crashes.
 On 16 April 1946 two RAF de Havilland Mosquitos of 85 Squadron collided at RAF Tangmere, Sussex.
 On 30 April 1946 two RAF Bristol Beaufighters of 254 Squadron collided over Suffolk.
 On 30 April 1946 two RAF Supermarine Spitfires collide while in formation near RAF Digby, Lincolnshire.
 On 25 April 1946 two RAF Airspeed Oxfords collided near Longcot, Berkshire.
 On 16 May 1946 two RAF Hawker Tempests collided at Chilbolton.
 On 10 July 1946 a RAF Gloster Meteor of 74 Squadron hit another Meteor while flying in formation and crashed into the ground.
 On 27 June 1946 an RAF Supermarine Spitfire collided with a Vickers Wellington over east Yorkshire during a practice attack.
 On 26 July 1946 an RAF Supermarine Spitfire collided with a Vickers Wellington over east Yorkshire during a practice attack, both aircraft were from the Central Gunnery School.
 On 14 September 1946 two RAF Hawker Tempests of 3 Squadron collided over Kent.
 On 17 October 1946 an RAF Airspeed Oxford collided with a de Havilland Tiger Moth near Sandridge, Hertfordshire.
1947
 On 11 November 1947 a de Havilland Hornet of No. 19 Squadron RAF collided with an Avro Lancaster of No. 115 Squadron RAF near Stanford during a practice attack.
 On 7 December 1947 two RAF Supermarine Spitfire LF.16s of 614 Squadron collided near Long Sutton in Somerset.
1948
 On 17 March 1948 two RAF Vickers Wellingtons of the No.1 Air Navigation School collided near Topcliffe, Yorkshire.
 On 25 May 1948 an RAF de Havilland Mosquito NF36 of 141 Squadron collided at night near Saxlingham Green, Norfolk with a Percival Proctor.
 On 31 May 1948 an RAF de Havilland Dominie C1 collided with an RAF Avro Anson near Bulford, Wiltshire.
 On 4 July 1948 an Avro York of the RAF and a Scandinavian Airlines System-operated Douglas DC-6 were involved in a collision over Northwood, London. Both aircraft crashed into a wooded area and the aircraft were destroyed. All 32 passengers and crew on the DC-6 and all seven crewmembers of the York were killed.
 On 9 July 1948 a RAF Airspeed Oxford landed safely after collided with a Tiger Moth on approach to Perth, Scotland but the aircraft was not repaired.
 On 13 September 1948 two RAF de Havilland Mosquitos collided near West Malling.
 On 24 September a RAF Gloster Meteor of 1 Squadron collided with a, RAF Tiger Moth at RAF Tangmere, both aircraft fatally crashed.
 On 29 October 1948 two RAF Supermarine Spitfire LF16s collided near Hartland Point, Devon.
 On 17 November 1948 two RAF de Havilland Tiger Moths collided near RAF Leuchars, Scotland.
 On 30 November 1948 two RAF Supermarine Spitfire LF16s collided near Braunton, Devon.
1949
 On 3 February 1949 two RAF North American Harvards collided while in formation and one crashed near RAF Marham, Norfolk. 
 On 16 February 1949 two RAF Supermarine Spitfire F.16s of 631 Squadron collide near Merioneth, Wales, one aircraft crashed into sea and one landed safely but was not repaired.
 On 19 February 1949 a British European Airways Douglas Dakota on a flight from Glasgow to London collided with a RAF Avro Anson over the village Exhall killing all 14 passengers and crew on both aircraft.
 On 1 March 1949 two RAF Avro Ansons collide and crash near Uffington, Berkshire.
 On 15 June 1949 two RAF Supermarine Spitfire F.16s of 601 Squadron collide while in formation over Surrey, one force landed and the other crashed with the loss of the pilot.
 On 28 June 1949 two RAF Gloster Meteors of 257 Squadron collide near RAF Finningley, Yorkshire and both are abandoned. 
 On 23 August 1949 two RAF Supermarine Spitfires of 541 Squadron collide while in formation over Berkshire and are abandoned.
 On 15 September 1949 two RAF De Havilland Mosquitos of 109 Squadron collide during a Battle of Britain flypast at RAF Snettisham in Lincolnshire, both crash land.
 On 26 September 1949 two RAF Avro Lincolns on a night exercise collide with a loss of seven crew on each aircraft.
 On 20 October 1949 a RAF de Havilland Tiger Moth was hit from behind by a civil Auster in the circuit at Wolverhampton aerodrome and crashed.
 On 3 November 1949 an Avro Lancaster of No. 148 Squadron RAF collides south of Selsey Bill, Sussex with a No. 29 Squadron RAF de Havilland Mosquito during a night interception exercise.
 On 23 November 1949 a RAF Gloster Meteor collides with a Percival Proctor over Norfolk, both aircraft fatally crash.

1950s
1951
 On 27 January 1951 two RAF De Havilland Tiger Moths of 17 RFS collided near South Ockendon, Essex.
 On 26 April 1951 two RAF North American Harvard T.2Bs of the Central Flying School collide near Moreton-in-Marsh.
 On 18 May 1951 two RAF North American Harvards of 6 Flying Training School collide near Ledbury, Herefordshire, two killed.
 On 18 June 1951 two RAF Gloster Meteors of 600 Squadron collide near RAF Biggin Hill.
 On 2 July 1951 two RAF North American Harvards of 1 FTS collide near Graveley.
 On 3 July 1951 two RAF Gloster Meteors collided near RAF Strubby.
 On 13 August 1951 an AF Miles Martinet TT.1 of No. 228 OCU collided with a Vickers Wellington over North Yorkshire and spun in, eight were killed, with one survivor. Flight Lieutenant John Quinton DFC was awarded a posthumous George Cross for his gallantry in the aftermath of the crash, in which he died.
 On 15 September 1951 two RAF Gloster Meteors collided during a formation roll near RAF Waterbeach.
 On 1 November 1951 two RAF Gloster Meteors collided on landing at RAF Waterbeach.
1952
 On 7 January 1952 two RAF Gloster Meteors collided in the circuit at RAF Linton-on-Ouse.
 On 20 January 1952 two RAF Gloster Meteors collided near RAF Linton-on-Ouse, Yorkshire.
 On 29 February 1952 two RAF Gloster Meteors collided near York, Yorkshire.
 On 6 March 1952 two RAF de Havilland Vampires collided during a formation take-off at RAF Valley.
 On 18 April 1952 two Sabre 2 jets collided near the bombing range at RAF Wainfleet in Lincolnshire
 On 5 May 1952 a Royal Air Force Gloster Meteor collided with a United States Air Force (USAF) North American F-86 Sabre near Guildford, Surrey.
 On 20 May 1952 two RAF Gloster Meteors collided 20 miles east of Great Yarmouth, Norfolk.
 On 20 June 1952 an RAF Gloster Meteor collided with a Vickers Wellington six miles north-west of RAF Newton.
 On 16 July 1952 two RAF Gloster Meteors collided near Ottringham, Yorkshire.
 On 31 July 1952 two RAF Gloster Meteors collided near Rayne, Essex.
 On 19 August 1952 two RAF Gloster Meteors collided near Debenham, Suffolk.
 On 19 August 1952 two RAF Gloster Meteors collided near Stanhope, County Durham.
 On 15 September 1952 to RAF Avro Ansons collided near Widdrington, Essex.
 On 17 October 1952 two RAF Gloster Meteors collided near Witham, Essex.
 On 4 November 1952 two RAF Gloster Meteors collided over Norwich, Norfolk.
 On 14 November 1952 two RAF Gloster Meteors collided over Norwich, Norfolk.
 On 11 December 1952 two RAF Gloster Meteors collided 23 miles north-north-east of Whitby, Yorkshire.
 On 18 December 1952 two RAF Gloster Meteors collided near Alpheton, Suffolk.
1953
 On 9 February 1953 two RAF Gloster Meteors collided at RAF Weston Zoyland.
 On 18 March 1953 two RAF Gloster Meteors collided in formation, three miles south-west of Duxford.
 On 28 April 1953 two RAF de Havilland Chipmunks collided near Kirby Muxloe, Leicestershire.
 On 24 July 1953 two RAF de Havilland Vampires collided on approach to Meryfield.
 On 1 September 1953 two RAF de Havilland Vampires collided 1 mile south west of Hartland Point, Devon.
 On 11 September 1953 two RAF Gloster Meteors collided Woolwich, London.
 On 7 November 1953 two RAF Gloster Meteors collided near Headcorn, Kent.
 On 30 November 1953 two RAF Gloster Meteors collided near Horham, Suffolk.
1954
 On 5 March 1954 two RAF Gloster Meteors collided four miles east of Deal, Kent.
 On 24 July 1954 two RAF Gloster Meteors collided near RAF Leuchars, Scotland.
 On 20 February 1954 two RAF Gloster Meteors collided five miles south of North Weald, Essex.
 On 3 April 1954 two RAF Gloster Meteors collided near Chipping Ongar, Essex.
 On 16 June 1954 two Royal Air Force Canadair Sabres collided near Hornsea, Yorkshire.
 On 24 July 1954 two RAF Gloster Meteors collided one mile north-west of RAF Leuchars, Scotland.
 On 26 July 1954 two Royal Air Force Percival Provosts collided at RAF Ternhill, Shropshire.
 On 9 September 1954 two RAF Gloster Meteors collided near Neatishead, Norfolk.
 On 4 October 1954 two RAF Gloster Meteors collided north of Chelmsford, Essex.
 On 4 October 1954 a Royal Air Force Gloster Meteor collided with a USAF North American F-86 Sabre near RAF Wattisham, Suffolk.
 On 28 November 1954 two Royal Air Force de Havilland Venoms collided near Hamble.
1955
 On 3 March 1955 a Royal Air Force Gloster Meteor collided with a Royal Navy de Havilland Sea Vampire near Paines Wood, Sussex.
 On 19 April 1955 two RAF Gloster Meteors collided in formation, five miles east of Peterborough, Lincolnshire.
 On 15 August 1955 two RAF Gloster Meteors collided near Barmston, Yorkshire.
 On 17 August 1955 a Royal Air Force Canadair Sabre collided with a Royal Navy Hawker Sea Hawk three miles east of Yeovilton, Somerset.
 On 26 August 1955 two RAF Gloster Meteors collided seven miles north of Ipswich, Suffolk.
 On 2 September 1955 two RAF Hawker Hunters collided at RAF Chivenor, Devon.
 On 13 September 1955 two RAF Percival Provosts collided at RAF Hullavington.
 On 21 September 1955 two RAF Gloster Meteors collided near Church Broughton, Derbyshire.
 On 24 October 1955 two RAF Percival Provosts collided near Yatton Keynell, Wiltshire.
1956
 On 11 January 1956 two RAF Percival Provosts collided in circuit at RAF Ternhill, Shropshire.
 On 26 February 1956 two RAF Percival Provosts in formation collided near Tuxford, Nottinghamshire.
 On 24 August 1956 an RAF Hawker Hunter collided with a Gloster Javelin over Wotton-under-edge, Gloucestershire.
 On 22 October 1956 a Royal Air Force Boulton Paul Balliol collided with a de Havilland Chipmunk in the circuit at Middle Wallop.
1957
 On 3 January 1957 two RAF Gloster Meteors collided near Hales, Norfolk.
 On 14 January 1957 two RAF Gloster Meteors collided in formation near Worms Head, Glamorgan.
 On 7 June 1957 two RAF Hawker Hunters collided during formation aerobatics near North Weald, Essex.
 On 10 September 1957 an RAF Hawker Hunter collided with a Royal Navy Westland Whirlwind near East Stratton, Hampshire.
 On 25 November 1957 a Royal Air Force Gloster Meteor collided with a USAF Republic F-84 Thunderjet near Newmarket, Suffolk.
1958
 On 16 January 1958 two RAF de Havilland Vampires collided near Nottingham.
 On 4 March 1958 two RAF Gloster Meteors collided in the circuit at RAF Church Fenton, Yorkshire.
 On 5 May 1958 two RAF Hawker Hunters collided during a practice dogfight off Selsey Bill, Sussex.
 On 13 June 1958 a Royal Air Force English Electric Canberra collided with a United States Air Force Lockheed T-33 near Spaldwick, Huntingdonshire.
1959
 On 31 January 1959 two RAF de Havilland Vampires collided at RAF Cranwell.
 On 25 August 1959 two RAF Hawker Hunters collided near Langley Street, Norfolk.
 On 1 September 1959 two RAF Gloster Javelins collided near Brundall, Norfolk.
 On 6 October 1959 two RAF Percival Provosts collided.
 On 15 October 1959 two RAF de Havilland Vampires collided during formation aerobatics near Oakington.

1960s
1960
 On 21 May 1960 two RAF Gloster Javelins collided four miles north-west of West Hartlepool, County Durham.
 On 10 June 1960 two RAF Hawker Hunters collided during formation aerobatics near RAF Wattisham.
 On 24 November 1960 two RNAS Hawker Sea Hawks collided over the sea off the coast of Scotland.
1961
 On 24 March 1961 two RAF de Havilland Vampires collided during a formation loop near RAF Binbrook.
1962
 On 14 August 1962 two RAF Percival Provosts collided near Ouston.
 On 4 November 1962 a Royal Air Force de Havilland Chipmunk collided with a civil Beagle Terrier two miles south of Reading, Berkshire.
1963
 On 29 January 1963 two RAF BAC Jet Provosts collided while landing at RAF Church Fenton.
 On 7 March 1963 two RAF Hawker Hunters collided during formation aerobatics near Hartland Point, Devon.
 On 6 June 1963 two RAF English Electric Lightnings collided near Great Bricett, Suffolk.
1964
 On 12 March 1964 two RAF BAC Jet Provosts collided near Moreton-in-Marsh.
1965
 On 20 April 1965 two RAF BAC Jet Provosts collided near Northallerton, North Yorkshire.
1966
 On 26 May 1966 two RAF BAC Jet Provosts collided and one then collided with another Jet Provost over Nottinghamshire.
 14 June 1966 a RAF Vickers Varsity collides with a civilian Cessna 337 near Ulceby, Lincolnshire.
 On 23 June 1966 two RAF de Havilland Chipmunks collided near Tibberton Grange, Shropshire.
 On 17 December 1966 a Royal Air Force and a civil de Havilland Chipmunk collided on approach to Hamble airfield, Hampshire.
1967
 On 15 May 1967 two RAF Hawker Hunters collided near Tintagel, Cornwall.
 On 12 September 1967 two RAF de Havilland Chipmunks in formation collided two miles south-west of Portishead, Somerset.
1968
 On 26 February two RAF BAC Jet Provosts collided over Gloucestershire. 
 On 19 August two RAF planes collided over Holt. Seven airmen were killed.  A Victor aircraft and a Canberra collided.

1970s
1971
 On 20 January 1971 two RAF Hawker Siddeley Gnats collided over RAF Kemble,
 On 29 January 1971 two RAF English Electric Canberras collided near Mansfield, Nottinghamshire.
 On 2 March 1971 a Royal Air Force BAC Jet Provost collided with a Royal Navy Percival Sea Prince near Selby, Yorkshire.
1972
 On 16 February 1972 two RAF English Electric Lightnings collided 60 miles east of Harwich, Essex.
 On 10 August 1972 two RAF Hawker Hunters collided on approach to RAF Valley.
1973
 On 7 May 1973 two RAF BAC Jet Provosts collided near RAF Dishforth, Yorkshire.
1974
 On 9 August 1974 a RAF McDonnell-Douglas Phantom FGR2 of 41 Sqn collided at low-level with a Piper Pawnee crop-spraying aircraft at Fordham, Norfolk, near Downham Market.
1976
 On 19 January 1976 two RAF Hawker Siddeley Harriers collided near Nantwich, Cheshire.
 30 April 1976 two RAF Hawker Siddeley Gnats collided near Dolgellau, Wales.
1979
 On 21 September two RAF Hawker Siddeley Harriers collided above Wisbech One of them crashed, killing three people on the ground.

1980s
1982
 On 14 April 1982 two RAF McDonnell-Douglas Phantoms collided on take-off from RAF Coningsby, Lincolnshire.
1983
 On 23 February 1983 two RAF Hawker Siddeley Harriers collided near Peterborough, Norfolk.
 On 29 July 1983 two RAF Hawker Siddeley Hawks collided over Devon.
 On 12 July 1984 a Royal Air Force SEPECAT Jaguar and a Panavia Tornado collided two miles west of Sheringham, Norfolk.
1985
 On 7 October 1985 two RAF SEPECAT Jaguars collided while in formation over Cumbria.
1986
 On 25 May 1986 the Vintage Pair, a Gloster Meteor and de Havilland Vampire of the Royal Air Force's Central Flying School, collided during a display at RAF Mildenhall.
 On 6 June 1986 two RAF BAC Jet Provosts collided near Helmsley, North Yorkshire.
1987
 On 17 June 1987 a Royal Air Force SEPECAT Jaguar and Panavia Tornado collided off Cumbria.
 On 7 September 1987 two RAF McDonnell-Douglas Phantoms collided 55 miles east of RAF Leuchars, Scotland.
 On 2 November 1987 two RAF Hawker Siddeley Harriers collided during a practice attack at Otterburn ranges, Northumberland.
 On 16 November 1987 two RAF Hawker Siddeley Hawks of the Red Arrows aerobatic team collided during a practice display near RAF Scampton.
1989
 On 14 June 1989 two RAF Hawker Siddeley Hawks collided near Dyfed, Wales.

1990s
1990
 On 9 January 1990 a Royal Air Force SEPECAT Jaguar collided with a Royal Air Force PANAVIA Tornado near Hexham.
1991
 On 29 August 1991 a Royal Air Force SEPECAT Jaguar collided with a civil Cessna 152 near Carno, Powys.
1993
 On 24 July 1993 two Mikoyan MiG-29s of the Russian Air Force collided in midair during a display at the Royal International Air Tattoo at Fairford, Gloucestershire.

2000s
2009
 On 11 February 2009 two Grob Tutor aircraft collided above Porthcawl, South Wales, killing the four people on board the two aircraft.
 On 14 June 2009 a Grob Tutor and a Cirrus Glider collided near Drayton, Oxfordshire.

2010s
2012
 On 3 July 2012 two Royal Air Force PANAVIA Tornados collided over the Moray Firth.
2017
 17 November 2017, mid air collision between a light aircraft and helicopter, over Waddesdon, near Aylesbury in Buckinghamshire

References

Bibliography

 Ray Sturtivant and Gordon Page Royal Navy Aircraft Serials and Units 1911–1919 Air-Britain, 1992. 

Air traffic control in the United Kingdom
Aviation accidents and incidents in the United Kingdom
United Kingdom
Mid-air collisions
United Kingdom aviation-related lists